Darragh O'Donovan (born 1995) is an Irish hurler who plays as a midfielder for club side Doon and at inter-county level with the Limerick senior hurling team. His partner is well known Cork All-Ireland Winning Camogie Captain Ashling Thompson

Playing career

University

During his studies at Mary Immaculate College, O'Donovan was selected at midfield for the college's senior hurling team during his second year. On 27 February 2016, he won a Fitzgibbon Cup medal as Mary I won their first ever title after a 1-30 to 3-22 defeat of the University of Limerick. O'Donovan was at right wing-forward when Mary I retained the title in 2017 following a 3-24 to 1-19 defeat of Carlow Institute of Technology.

Club

O'Donovan joined the Doon club at a young age and played in all grades at juvenile and underage levels, enjoying championship success in under-12, under-14 and under-15 grades. As a member of the club's minor team, he won back-to-back championship medals in 2012 and 2013 following respective defeats of Patrickswell and Na Piarsaigh. O'Donovan subsequently made his senior championship debut for the club.

Inter-county

Minor and under-21

O'Donovan first played for Limerick at minor level. On 23 July 2013, he was at midfield when Limerick won their first Munster Championship title in 29 years after a 1-20 to 4-08 defeat of Waterford.

O'Donovan joined the Limerick under-21 hurling team in 2014. In his second season he won a Munster Championship medal after a 0-22 to 0-19 win over Clare in the final. On 12 September 2015, O'Donovan was at midfield when Limerick defeated Wexford in the All-Ireland final. He ended the season by being named on the Bord Gáis Energy Team of the Year.

Senior

O'Donovan made his senior debut for Limerick on 13 February 2016 in a National League defeat of Wexford. Later that season he made his first championship start in a 1-24 to 0-18 defeat by Westmeath.

O'Donovan missed most of the 2018 National League after sustaining a broken finger. On 19 August 2018, O'Donovan scored a point from midfield when Limerick won their first All-Ireland title in 45 years after a 3-16 to 2-18 defeat of Galway in the final. O'Donovan ended the season by being nominated for an All-Star Award.

On 31 March 2019, O'Donovan was selected at midfield for Limerick's National League final meeting with Waterford at Croke Park. He collected a winners' medal after scoring a point from a line ball in the 1-24 to 0-19 victory. On 30 June 2019, O'Donovan won a Munster Championship medal as a non-playing substitute following Limerick's 2-26 to 2-14 defeat of Tipperary in the final.

Career statistics

Honours

Mary Immaculate College
Fitzgibbon Cup (2): 2016, 2017

Doon
Limerick Minor Hurling Championship (2): 2012, 2013

Limerick
All-Ireland Senior Hurling Championship (3): 2018, 2020, 2021,
Munster Senior Hurling Championship (3): 2019,  2020, 2021
National Hurling League (2): 2019, 2020
All-Ireland Under-21 Hurling Championship (1): 2015
Munster Under-21 Hurling Championship (1): 2015
Munster Minor Hurling Championship (1): 2013

References

1995 births
Living people
Doon hurlers
Limerick inter-county hurlers
Alumni of Mary Immaculate College, Limerick
All Stars Awards winners (hurling)